Jubilee Records was an American independent record label, specializing in rhythm and blues and novelty records. It was founded in New York City in 1946 by Herb Abramson. His partner was Jerry Blaine. Blaine bought Abramson's half of the company in 1947, when Abramson went on to co-found Atlantic Records with Ahmet Ertegun. The company name was Jay-Gee Recording Company, a subsidiary of the Cosnat Corporation. Cosnat was a wholesale record distributor.

History
Jubilee was the first independent record label to reach the white market with a black vocal group, when the Orioles' recording of "Crying in the Chapel" reached the Top Twenty on the Pop chart in 1953.

The Four Tunes started recording for Jubilee in 1953. The biggest early hit for Jubilee was "Crying in the Chapel" by the Orioles. A subsidiary label, Josie Records, was formed in 1954 and issued more uptempo material. Hits on Josie included "Speedoo" by the Cadillacs (number 3 R&B, number 17 pop) and "Do You Wanna Dance" by Bobby Freeman (number 2 R&B, number 5 pop). The biggest success was the million-seller "Last Kiss", by J. Frank Wilson and the Cavaliers, which reached number 2 on the Billboard Hot 100 in 1964. In the late 1960s, The Meters, a group of New Orleans session musicians, released a series of R&B instrumental hits, including "Cissy Strut", which reached number 4 R&B and number 23 pop. The label's last rock-and-roll hit was the rhythm-and-blues instrumental "Poor Boy"/"Wail!" by the Royaltones (number 17, 1957).

Of the label's novelty recordings, releases by the blooper compiler Kermit Schaefer, and the comedian Rusty Warren were successful.

Jubilee/Josie also had a custom label, Gross Records, whose only artist was Doug Clark and the Hot Nuts; their material was so off-color that the Jubilee and Josie names appeared nowhere on their albums.

In 1970, Jubilee/Josie, in financial difficulties, was sold to Viewlex, which owned Buddah Records, and Blaine left the company. The catalog was eventually taken over by Roulette Records. The label was declared bankrupt in 1971.

In the late 1980s, Roulette was sold jointly to Rhino Records and EMI, and in the 1990s, Rhino was sold to Time Warner. The rights to the Jubilee Records archives in North America are now owned by Warner Music, with EMI holding the rights in the rest of the world until 2013.

Warner Music Group now has worldwide rights to the Roulette/Jubilee catalogue as a result of acquiring Parlophone in 2013.

Roster
This is a list of recording artists who have had at least one recording released  on the Jubilee Records label.

The Association
Sil Austin
Jim Backus
Harry Belafonte
Polly Bergen
The Blades of Grass
The Bobbettes
Jimmy Boyd
Piney Brown
Tedd Browne
Vinnie Burke
The Cadillacs
The Channels
Bobby Comstock and the Counts
Don Cornell
Eddie Costa
Bob Crewe
The Cues
Alan Dale
Vivian Dandridge
The Delta Rhythm Boys
The Dominoes
Dorothy Donegan
Ray Draper

Dave Dudley
The Fifth Estate
The Five Sharps
The Four Coins
The Four Tunes
Bobby Freeman
The Gallahads
Erroll Garner
Herb Geller
The Happenings
Betty Harris
Emmylou Harris
Jack Haskell 
Dick Haymes
Autry Inman
Conrad Janis and the Tailgaters
The Jesters
Aliza Kashi
The King Sisters
Baker Knight
Moe Koffman
The Larks
Little Sylvia (Sylvia Robinson)

Bill Mack
The Marylanders
Lou McGarity
Rod McKuen
Memphis Slim
Charles Mingus
Domenico Modugno
Lou Monte
Vaughn Monroe
Oliver
Sy Oliver
The Orioles
Frankie Ortega
Billy Paul
The Raindrops
Carl Ravazza
The Ray-O-Vacs
The Rebels
Della Reese
Sylvia Robbins (Sylvia Robinson)
Sylvia Robinson
Don Rondo
The Royal Teens

Kermit Schaefer
Walter Scharf
Allan Sherman
Bobby Sherwood
Lu Ann Simms
Smith & Dale
Lou Stein
Larry Storch
Enzo Stuarti
Gene Summers and His Rebels
Donna Theodore
Jo Ann Tolley
The Top Notes
The Valentinos
The Volumes
Billy Ward and the Dominoes
Rusty Warren
Dee Dee Warwick
Ethel Waters
Mary Wells
Randy Weston
Ilene Woods

Josie Records artists
This is a list of recording artists who have had at least one recording released  on the Josie Records label.
 The Cadillacs
 The Chaperones
 Carol Fran
 Bobby Freeman
 The Meters
 J. Frank Wilson and the Cavaliers

See also
 List of record labels

References

External links
 Jerry Blaine
 The Jubilee/Josie Records Story from BSN Pubs
 Jubilee singles discography
 Jubilee Records on the Internet Archive's Great 78 Project

Defunct record labels of the United States
Record labels established in 1946
Record labels disestablished in 1970
Rhythm and blues record labels
American independent record labels
1946 establishments in New York City